The 2015 Pacific Games men's football tournament was the 14th edition of the Pacific Games men's football tournament. The men's football tournament was held in Port Moresby, Papua New Guinea between 3–17 July 2015 as part of the 2015 Pacific Games. The tournament was age-restricted and open to men's under-23 national teams only.

The tournament also doubled as the 7th edition of the OFC Men's Olympic Qualifying Tournament, the quadrennial international tournament organised by the Oceania Football Confederation (OFC) to determine which men's under-23 national teams from Oceania qualify for the Olympic football tournament. A separate qualifying tournament was initially set to take place at Tonga between 2–12 December 2015. However, it was later decided to absorb the qualifying tournament into the Pacific Games, as the New Zealand team participated for the first time in the Pacific Games men's football tournament.

As some of the participating teams are not members of the International Olympic Committee (IOC) and thus ineligible for the Olympics, there were two separate knockout stages, one for Olympic qualifying where the winner qualified for the 2016 Summer Olympics men's football tournament, and another for determining the Pacific Games medalists.

New Caledonia won the Pacific Games gold medal, while Fiji qualified for the Olympic football tournament for the first time after winning the OFC Olympic qualifying tournament.

Teams
A total of eight teams participated in the tournament.

Eligibility status
The teams are eligible for one or both knockout stages depending on their affiliation.

Venues

Squads

Group stage
The draw was held on 1 June 2015 at the OFC Headquarters at Auckland. The eight teams were drawn into two groups of four.

For the OFC Men's Olympic Qualifying Tournament, only the five teams (Fiji, New Zealand, Papua New Guinea, Solomon Islands and Vanuatu) which are FIFA and IOC members were eligible. The top two IOC member teams of each group advanced to the Olympic Qualifying semi-finals.

For the Pacific Games Men's Football Tournament, the top two teams of each group advanced to the Pacific Games semi-finals with the exception of New Zealand, who were not eligible as they are not a Pacific Games Council member.

All times UTC+10.

Group A

Group B

Olympic Qualifying knockout stage
Only the five teams (Fiji, New Zealand, Papua New Guinea, Solomon Islands and Vanuatu) which are both FIFA and IOC members were eligible for this stage.

Olympic Qualifying semi-finals

New Zealand advanced to the Olympic Qualifying final with a 2–0 result, but were replaced by Vanuatu on the day of the final after the Oceania Football Confederation found that they had fielded an ineligible player, Deklan Wynne. The match was declared a 3–0 victory for Vanuatu. New Zealand were unable to appeal before the final was played and subsequently announced they would appeal, but on 23 October 2015, the OFC announced that New Zealand's appeal had been rejected, meaning New Zealand's only chance to overturn the decision would be to appeal to the Court of Arbitration for Sport. On 13 November 2015, New Zealand Football confirmed that they would not appeal.

Olympic Qualifying final

Fiji qualified for 2016 Summer Olympics. This was the first time a team from OFC other than Australia or New Zealand qualified for the Olympics.

1 Bold indicates champion for that year. Italic indicates host for that year. Statistics include all Olympic format (current Olympic under-23 format started in 1992).

Pacific Games knockout stage
New Zealand were not eligible as they are not a Pacific Games Council member.

Pacific Games semi-finals

Bronze medal match

Gold medal match

Goalscorers
17 goals
 Jean Kaltack

11 goals
 Antonio Tuivuna

10 goals
 Bill Nicholls

9 goals

 Napolioni Qasevakatini
 Christopher Wasasala

8 goals
 Fred Tissot

6 goals

 Tony Kaltack
 Barry Mansale

5 goals

 Garish Prasad
 Iosefo Verevou
 Michel Maihi

4 goals

 Manuarii Hauata
 Mauarii Tehina
 Tevairoa Tehuritaua

3 goals

 Monty Patterson
 Logan Rogerson
 Tommy Semmy
 Raiamanu Tauira
 Yohann Tihoni

2 goals

 Manasa Nawakula
 Jim Ouka
 Dalong Damalip
 Brian Kaltack
 Abraham Roqara

1 goal

 Nickel Chand
 Savenaca Nakalevu
 Tevita Waranaivalu
 Cedric Decoire
 Pierre Kauma
 Raphael Oiremoin
 Te Atawhai Hudson-Wihongi
 Luka Prelevic
 Alex Rufer
 Bill Tuiloma
 Patrick Aisa
 Alwin Komolong
 Jacob Sabua
 Davidson Tome
 Tauatua Lucas
 Louis Petigas
 Tehei Taupotini
 Chris Andrews
 Zicka Manuhi
 Nemani Nickiau

Own goal
 Allen Peter (playing against New Caledonia)

See also
Football at the 2015 Pacific Games – Women's tournament

References

External links
Official 2015 Pacific Games website
XV Pacific Games Men's Tournament, Official OFC website

Ofc
2015
Mens